Win Win Yeung On-ni (born 8 May 1996), known professionally as Win Win, is a Hong Kong singer, presenter, choreographer and dance teacher.

Biography 
Win Win Yeung was a dance teacher and backup dancer of concerts before participating in ViuTV reality talent contest programme King Maker IV. She got 5th place on the show. She had an offer to be a member of girl group COLLAR but she rejected it.
She thought she didn't fit the standard to be a girl group member and she wanted to back to be a dance teacher. Her friend suggested her trying different things other than dancing only. She changed her mind now. She wanted to appear on TV and perform on stage in order to introduce dancing to more people. Later, she received a phone call from MakerVille about contract signing. She didn't believe she had a second chance. She signed to MakerVille to film programmes for ViuTV. She is also a choreographer for groups such as P1X3L, COLLAR and Lolly Talk. Singer Alfred Hui invited her to participate in a dance pop song called "Masquerade" (2022). In 2023, she is the only host of TV show "Pay less, Play more" about travelling to Japan.

Discography

Singles

Collaborations

Filmography

Drama

Variety show

Videography

Music videos

Choreographic Works 
 P1X3L - Just Lean On Me (2021)
 Lolly Talk - Triple Sweetness (2022)
 COLLAR - OFF/ON (2022)

References

External links 
 
Win Win Yeung's Youtube Channel 

1996 births
Living people
Hong Kong idols
King Maker IV contestants
Hong Kong television personalities
21st-century Hong Kong women singers
Choreographers
Cantopop singer-songwriters
Hong Kong singer-songwriters
Hong Kong women singer-songwriters
MakerVille artists